Mihaela Stănuleţ (born 16 July 1967) is a retired Romanian artistic gymnast who competed internationally between 1979 and 1984. She is an Olympic gold medalist and a world silver medalist with the team. Individually, she won a bronze medal on the beam at the 1983 European Championships and placed fourth on the uneven bars at the 1984 Olympic Games. After retiring from competitions, she became a coach at CSŞ Sibiu. Her trainees included Steliana Nistor.

References

External links 
 

1967 births
Living people
Romanian female artistic gymnasts
Gymnasts at the 1984 Summer Olympics
Olympic gymnasts of Romania
Olympic gold medalists for Romania
Medalists at the World Artistic Gymnastics Championships
Olympic medalists in gymnastics
Medalists at the 1984 Summer Olympics
Sportspeople from Sibiu
20th-century Romanian women